Speakerzoid is the second studio album by Australian indie rock band The Jungle Giants. The album was released on 7 August 2015 and peaked at number 25 on the ARIA Charts.

Lead singer Sam Hales explains the title comes from his girlfriend misunderstanding a lyric in a song. He said "Someone was playing the Sonic Youth song Teenage Riot' and my girlfriend thought she was saying 'Speakerzoid' (when she was saying 'spirit desire'). After a while I just really liked the word."

Upon release, Hales told The AU Review "We've always looked for the opportunity, if you've seen us live, whenever we get the chance, we'll lose our heads a bit and go crazy. With this record, we wanted to create more chances for that, more opportunities for a stage dive or anything like banging your head on guitars! It's a record that we wanted to make so that the live sets would come together as this big thing that, once you left, your brain would be a bit fried."

The album was supported by an Australian tour throughout September and October 2015 and the USA in October and November 2015.

Critical reception

 
Mikey Cahill from news.com.au gave the album 3 out of 5 called the album "fluttery" saying "this feels like the good album before a truly original, great album."

Chelsea Deeley from Music Feeds said "Whether you perceive it as an intelligent array of well-placed, interesting sounds, or a bit of a Jackson Pollack canvas with a few effective flicks; The Jungle Giants can be commended on their motivation to create an experimental indie-rock based record that's definitely worth mulling over."

Kim Taylor Bennett from Vice called the album a "louche, psych-toned pop collection" adding "There are some truly splendid moments on here, like the Bowie-meets-Pavement slice of lo-fi-pop 'What Do You Think'."

Track listing

Charts

Release history

References

2015 albums
The Jungle Giants albums